Morskaya Matuga, also Ostrovok Morskaya Matuga or Motuga, is an islet in the Sea of Okhotsk, roughly 9 miles northeastward of the northern Khalpili Islet.
It is described as "a precipitous flat-topped islet".

References

Islands of the Sea of Okhotsk
Islands of the Russian Far East
Islands of Magadan Oblast
Uninhabited islands of Russia